The 1940 Australian federal election was held in Australia on 21 September 1940. All 74 seats in the House of Representatives and 19 of the 36 seats in the Senate were up for election. The incumbent Coalition, consisting of the United Australia Party led by Prime Minister Robert Menzies and the Country Party led by Archie Cameron, defeated the opposition Labor Party under John Curtin despite losing the overall popular vote.

The Coalition won 36 seats, two short of a majority, but formed a government on 28 October 1940 with the support of both independent crossbenchers, Alexander Wilson and Arthur Coles. The four MPs elected to Lang Labor's successor, the Australian Labor Party (Non-Communist), officially re-joined the ALP just months after the election in February 1941, bringing the ALP to 36 seats. The UAP–Country minority government lasted only until October 1941, when the two independents crossed the floor and allowed the ALP to form a minority government with Curtin as prime minister. It remains the only time since the 1910 introduction of the two-party system where the government has changed as the result of a parliamentary confidence vote.

Future opposition leaders H.V. Evatt and Arthur Calwell both entered parliament at this election.

Background
The 15th parliament elected in the 1937 election first sat on 30 November 1937. Under the constitution, the parliament would expire in November 1940 and a general election would have to held by January 1941. Throughout 1940, there were debates on whether the general election should be held or postponed in the midst of a world war. Throughout July and August 1940, Prime Minister Robert Menzies contemplated the prospect of an early election. The loss of three Cabinet ministers in the 1940 Canberra air disaster on 13 August also meant that three by-elections would have been required, followed within a few short months by a general election.

Both the Coalition and Labor supported Australia's ongoing participation in World War II. The Coalition's advertisements asked Australians to "Cast Your Vote for Unity and an All-in War Effort / Back the Government that's Backing Churchill", with a large picture of the British Prime Minister. Labor promised "A New Deal / for the Soldier / for the Soldier's wife / Widows, the Aged and Infirm / the Taxpayer / the Working Man / the Primary Producer".

Results

House of Representatives

Notes
 Independents: Arthur Coles (Henty, Vic) (see below), Alexander Wilson (Wimmera, Vic)
 The Country Party in Victoria was split over membership of the Coalition, with the state party opposing its members taking office. The official United Country Party elected two members, one of whom, George Rankin, sat in the federal Country Party room and the other, Alexander Wilson, sat as an Independent. A breakaway faction, the Liberal Country Party, was formed to support sitting ministers and elected two members, John McEwen and Thomas Paterson, who both sat in the federal Country Party room.

Senate

Notes
 Of the ten senators elected on UAP–Country joint tickets, seven were UAP members and three were Country Party members.

Seats changing hands

 Members listed in italics did not contest their seat at this election.

See also
 Candidates of the Australian federal election, 1940
 Members of the Australian House of Representatives, 1940–1943
 Members of the Australian Senate, 1941–1944

Notes

References
University of WA  election results in Australia since 1890
Two-party-preferred vote since 1937

Federal elections in Australia
1940 elections in Australia
September 1940 events